Eulima fuscozonata is a species of sea snail, a marine gastropod mollusk in the family Eulimidae. The species is one of a number within the genus Eulima.

Description

The shell measures approximately 5 mm and is usually found at depths of about 530 m below sea level.

Distribution

This species occurs in the following locations:

 European waters (ERMS scope)

References

External links
 To World Register of Marine Species

fuscozonata
Gastropods described in 1986